Machame is a Tanzanian historic area in northern Hai District, Kilimanjaro Region. Historically, Machame was in 1889 referred by Hans Meyer as a great African giant, also the largest and most populous of all the Chagga states in Kilimanjaro, whose ruler as early as 1849 was reckoned as a giant African king with influence extending throughout all Chagga states except Rombo. By the 1860s, a German explorer Von der Decken (popularly known to the Chagga as Baroni), presented Machame as a confederation of western Chagga states comprising Narumu, Kindi, Kombo, to as far as the Western end of Kibongoto, each with their own chiefs under the king of Machame. 'Baroni' observed that by that time only two of the Chagga states had some autonomy from the king of Machame, namely, Lambongo (later Kibosho under powerful chief Sina) and Kilema. The rapid and certain disintegration of its influence over other Chagga states after an atrocious attack and her subsequent subjugation by Sina of Kibosho in the mid-1889, led to a highly confined influence constrained between Machame itself and a neighbouring ward, Masama, where a frail sultan of Machame seemed to alternate in abode. Although by 1889 she was still estimated to comprise almost 20% of all the population of the Chagga, towards the end of the 19th Century Machame distinctly became a lowly chieftaincy still with claims of influence over Masama. Today Machame retains some of its beauty once praised by missionaries and explorers of the 19th century, with much of historical sites that remind of her admired historical past. The exciting view of mount Kilimanjaro from Machame and the adventurous route to its peak has continued to be the source of tourist attraction to this once a giant African state.

The name "Machame" therefore refers to an ethnic and linguistic group of people occupying this area historically as its homeland, as well as the specific location.

Machame language 
Although sometimes lumped with other Chaga languages, Machame is a distinct language (also known as "Kimachame" in Swahili and as "Kimashame" or "Kimashami" in the Machame language itself.  For most inhabitants of Machame and Masama (i.e., the Machame "tribe"), including children born and raised in this area, Kimachame is their first language; Swahili and English are learned via formal schooling.

Geography 
Physically, the location identified today as Machame forms several of 10 wards of the Hai District, in Kilimanjaro Region, Tanzania. Historically, the formation of Hai as one of the three divisions of the Chagga states by the British rule in 1946 with the recognition of Chief M.H. Abdiel Shangali of Machame as the divisional chief, could have been none other than tracing back the Chagga politics to its old pre-German colonial rule where the then King of Machame extended his influence. The Hai division comprised Chagga states from Siha in the Western-end of Chagga to river Nanga, forming a rough boundary within Vunjo to the further Eastern Chagga states of Rombo. By 1920s however, due to successive political instability and confusion in the obscure state of Siha, supposedly instigated by the Machame political aristocrats, Chief Abdiel Shangali of Machame re-claimed Siha by implying that "the efforts to make it independent from Machame have failed". Since the 1880s to 1946, Machame had lost 'for good' its influence over all the Chagga states from Weruweru river Eastwards. It was therefore the formation of the Hai division in 1946 that brought back the influence of the Chief of Machame to the Eastern Chagga states beyond Weruweru river. However, the redefinition of Chagga politics revived by the formation of divisions by the British rule would soon escalate to set the Chagga politics into the edge, the saga of which is discussed later in this article.

After Tanganyika independence in 1961, the provinces were abolished and local authorities redefined. The Hai division became Hai district which mainly included the Kilimanjaro area West of Weruweru river, hence, roughly comprising the old Chagga states once identified as the confederation under the ruler of Machame. In 2005, Siha became a new constituency separate from the Hai district. Today Machame-Masama form the Hai constituency separated by the Kikafu river, with Machame to its East and Masama to the West. Out of 10 wards that comprise the Hai constituency, 6 form part of Machame and 4 are Masama's. This division though, seems again to repeat the history of Machame chiefdom in the late 1880s and 1890s. Over and over again, a careful study of Chagga history and Machame in particular seems to amazingly confirm the theory of historic recurrence, where events repeat with patterns strikingly similar to what had happened before, even to the decisions made by authorities that have no clue to her historical past.

Ever since the latter part of the 20th century, the Machame Gate and Machame Camp have become the two locations in the Machame area most known to tourists visiting Tanzania, because these form part of the Machame route for treks ascending Mt. Kilimanjaro. There is one major, paved road traversing Machame. It begins at the south end stemming from the A23 Arusha-to-Himo main road (which also connects Moshi to Arusha). This intersection is 15 km from Moshi and 75 km from Arusha. The name of this intersection is commonly "Kilimanjaro Machine Tools", after the defunct business of the same name which left an abandoned building at the south edge of this intersection. This road proceeds north until it reaches the Machame Gate at the entrance to Kilimanjaro National Park. Several secondary, unpaved roads connect points within Machame.

Machame is traversed by several rivers that flow year-round within deep gorges running down the slopes of Mt. Kilimanjaro. In addition to the natural rivers, there are systems of flumes for irrigation that pre-date the colonial era. Although major infrastructure project spread piped water through much of the area in the 1990s and later, the flumes are still used and maintained for agricultural irrigation.

We will observe in this article that, although there is a particular location identified as Machame, due to historical reasons, the study will inevitably present Machame and Masama as a composite narrative and classical discourse as this seems to be the case ever since before Masama got that identity between 1860-1870. The presentation will alternate between the Machame as a confederation of Chagga states West of river Weruweru (by the 1860s), Machame as narrowly defining the Machame-Masama state by the end of the 1880s, and Machame as a location that bears that name (i.e. pre-1800 identity).

Economy and agricultural practices 
The majority of residents of Machame, like in many other rural areas of Tanzania, earn a living through agriculture. The year-round temperate climate and fairly high humidity allow cultivation of a huge variety of crops. Since the colonial period, coffee has been an important cash crop for export; however, its prominence has decreased in recent decades. As noted by Mbonile, et al., declining prices for exports have influenced farmers to replace coffee with annual crops like tomatoes, of which the surplus may be sold and consumed regionally. The overall land-use pattern in Machame (and surrounding foothill areas of Mt. Kilimanjaro) have changed broadly over the past 120 years—even more dramatically in the post-independence period. Specifically, increasing agricultural planting in the bottom three of the five climatic zones of Kilimanjaro has reduced native vegetation. Agriculture in Machame fits generally into two modes: home gardens consisting of multipurpose trees interspersed with food crops near houses, and the "shamba" lands, or small fields, where food crops like maize, finger millet, and beans are grown.

The formal economy in Machame is broadly disbursed across many high-frequency shops ("kiosks") throughout the many small villages comprising Machame. There are also several formal markets—e.g., Kalali near the main road, and Bwani near Uraa—that are organized and regulated by local government entities. Each market typically has one or two designated market days each week. Machame is also dotted with other small businesses such as mills for grain and presses for sunflower oil.

With the growing use of the Machame Route through Kilimanjaro National Park, a few businesses catering to tourists have emerged. Many are informal, small-scale vendors near the Machame Gate. Recently, the Protea hotel chain based in South Africa opened the Protea Hotel Aisha Machame just along the main north-south road.

Machame Hospital 
Among formal institutions in Machame, one of the oldest and most renown is the Machame Hospital.  This medical facility is located off the main north-south road between the post office and the Machame Gate, near Machame Girl's Secondary School. The hospital started with participation of Lutheran missionaries and has remained a mission hospital for over 100 years. While it has continuously served the population of Machame, many people travel from other areas to Machame Hospital because of the level of care.

History of settlement on the mountain

Overview 
Chagga history has a long, interesting and yet complex background as noted by the historian M.K. Stahl. It portrays an African heritage and socio-political system which preceded the colonial rule depicting somehow advanced African political systems even during the times of primitive African social lifestyle. Machame chiefdom for example, by the mid-1800s had expanded to rule all areas to the western part of Chagga. As narrated to Rev. Johannine Rebmann while in Kilema, the Chief of Machame had a command in all of the Chagga except Rombo. However, according to M.K. Stahl, the actual location identified by Machame name was but a small strip of land with total control and influence extending between the two major rivers of Kilimanjaro, i.e. Kikafu and Weruweru. The development therefore of what was later to be known as the greater Machame is of interest in this article including the study on different etymologies and the traditions which are expected to benefit those who study African history.

Migration to the mountain 
The Machame  and Meru people are said to have migrated from the Usambara mountains in Tanga Region 400 years ago to Kilimanjaro Region. However, it is not easy to know today when did the modern Chagga started to migrate to the Mountain. Many narrations exist, legendary or true, since many African tribes didn't have the tradition of writing down the events in their lifetimes. However, following Machame narrations, who are among the few Chagga families to recall the encounter with the earlier inhabitants on the mountain, it seems that the migration of the later people who came to be called the Chagga, started about 600 years ago.
The Machame elders recall the encounter of their ancestors with the earlier settlers of the mountain whom they referred to as the Koningo (wataremba), meaning, the pigmies (or mbilikimo in Swahili).

Since very few other Chagga clans on the mountain can recall the existence of such people on the mountain, this can mean that the machame ancestors might have been one of the earliest immigrants of the later Chaggas on the mountain. They describe the koningo as the short people with big heads carrying hones wherever they went. The horns were used for blowing in case one fell down for another one to come and lift him/her up. They also used hones to notify others of an important issue that needed caution or assembling. They were skilled in hunting and are described as very innocent people. However, these were replaced by the now migrating folks although till today the remains of these people can be traced on some parts of the mountain which indicates that some were integrated into the incoming migrants probably through marriage.
It was historical unfortunate that the later visitors to the mountain thought the Chagga to be one tribe. Since they were referred to as the Chagga by the Swahili from the coast, other visitors to the mountain such as missionaries and explorers thought that the mountain was dwelt by one tribe called the Chagga. However, this was not the case. 

The people who migrated to the mountain came from completely diverse backgrounds. There were those who came from the Usambara mountains, who migrated to the west and some parts of the central area of the mountain, those who migrated from the Kamba origin, especially those who settled to the east of the mountain together with the Taita, and those who had the maasai and waarush background who initially settled in the lower plains of the mountain but slowly some moved up to settle in upper parts of the mountain. Different reasons contributed to the migration of these different groups to the mountain, some of them are:
Fleeing from drought, famine or epidemics where they had lived.
A search for a peaceful environment, fleeing from wars and insecurity as they saw the mountainous place to be safer than where they had been.
A search for a more prosperous land, since the mountainous soil was very fertile with many streams of water and the weather was very promising for agricultural activities.
Travellers and those who went to the mountain for various activities such as trade, but decided to remain there.

All these reflect different backgrounds. Different backgrounds then mean different languages, cultures, skills and traditions although the fact that majority were of the Bantu origin, it accounted for the similarity of languages, cultures and traditions. Different groups came with different skills to the mountain like hunting, forging weapons, war skills, pot making, furrow making, making and collecting honey, etc. These various groups intermingled to some degree and their existence on the mountain is what formed what came to be known as Chagga complex. All these contributed to the high skills and the brightness that the Chagga people portrayed.

Etymology of the land
At this stage we will look at three important words in the Chagga history, chagga, kilimanjaro and moshi. Historian Mary K. Stahl and explorer Charles New give their opinions as to the meanings of the first two words. The origin of the word Chagga (dschagga or jagga) is not very clear today. K. Stahl gives differing opinions as to its origin although one of her opinions seem to concur with Charles new's meaning of "getting lost" or "to give farewell to someone who is about to take a journey that you are not sure if they will be back (as they may get lost forever)". In earlier Swahili language this would have been called 'kuchaaga' meaning to say bye. Today's Swahili is 'kuaga'. Why the land was attached with the word 'to get lost'? This is where the stories begin. It is claimed that the first coastal trade people to get into the land got lost due to the thick forests. As hypothesized by Stahl, it took them days to get their original route again and they thought that their getting lost was mysterious. When they went back to the coast they spread this news and the land was called Chaga (or Chagga) as a sign of getting lost.

Another explanation of the origin of the word, which also missionary Charles New mentioned as he quoted rev. Johannine Rebmann, is that the word came out of a terrible event that befell on people. The years of the event are not known to us but it was a time when a powerful chief of Machame, Rengua, was ruling and at that time caravans from the coast had already started to get there to trade on ivory with the natives. Being constantly instigated by the Swahili people that what is on top of the mountain has to do with silver which promises much richness to his kingdom, Chief Rengua sent a large band of emissary to get as much silver as possible down to him. A caravan trader from the coast Bwana Heri who accompanied rev. Rebmann to the mountain told him that he actually saw one of the survivors of the tragedy who had become disabled due to freezing temperature as they went up the mountain. The rest of the envoy perished on the way. The story that survived was that on the mountain there is a spirit that will destroy anyone who would try to get close to it, and the Swahili who were at the court of Rengua, seeing the disaster that had befallen those who went up, spread news to the coast that anyone trying to get higher on the mountain will get lost as the mountain has the dreadful spirit.

The land was called chaaga as commemoration of the tragedy. This story apart from being backed up by the people who were close to the event as recorded in the history books, also connects very well with stories that circulated in the coast when rev. Rebmann arrived there on his mission to the Chagga. On learning that Rebmann wanted to go to the land of Chagga, the Swahili sultan of Mombasa who was an Arab, warned him that the land is dangerous as there is a spirit on the mountain that destroys people and he might get lost when he tries to do so. He mentioned to Rebmann that the name of the spirit (as known in the coast) was 'ndscharo' and hence the mountain was called mountain of ndscharo (i.e. kilimandscharo). He could nearly stop Rebmann from going to the land of Chagga if it were not for Rebmann's persistence to go there. However, it shows that earlier the people of Chagga were known as 'wakirima', i.e. people of the mountain (kirima was an old Swahili word for a hill). Where they lived was known as the land of Chagga (i.e. land of getting lost) although later on the name was attached to the people themselves.

Of importance however, is the way the name 'Moshi' became prominent among the people of the mountain and by the early 1900s it could almost be used synonymously with the name of the Chagga land. Moshi was one of the chiefdoms in Chagga ruled by Rindi (1860–1890). Before that time the name scarcely surfaced in history although it seemed to be a recognisable location of some prominence. For example, in 1849, Rev. Rebmann mentions a young man who had come all the way from Moshi to trade honey and milk with his men when they camped at Machame. He also records in his diary of trouble in Kirua caused by one Kirumi who was supported by allies from Moshi (where his mother came from) to overthrow his father Marengo. This happened when Rev. Rebmann and his men were still in Kilema. These instances are the first appearances of Moshi in historical records, and just after a decade, Von der Decken records Moshi as a recognisable chiefdom although still not attained some autonomy from Machame as he observed earlier.

During Decken's visit to Chagga a young chief Rindi was ruling in Moshi. With much witticism and intrigue, and under the regency of his mother Mamchaki, Rindi established his chiefdom from a place known as tsudunyi in early 1860 and using the location of his chiefdom as a strategic advantage, directed many caravan traders to the mountain into his land. With much ambitions to power he even sabotaged caravans which did not show intention to pass through his chiefdom and those explorers who asked for guidance to other chiefdoms he conspired with his men who misguided them and got them lost or back to his chiefdom. However, there are indications that during his early days in power he acquired support from Machame to cleverly establish his presence in the east. By the early 1870s he could declare to foreigners that the whole of Chagga was divided into two major powers; Machame under Ndesserua being the greatest in the West and himself an important chief in the east. He substantiated his claim by providing a letter to Charles New that granted him safe passage to every chiefdom he could visit to the east of Chagga.

Having acquired autonomy from Machame through allied raids to the east of Chagga and as far as Usambara, with extraordinary diplomatic schemes, by 1870 he could direct to his capital, Moshi, most missionaries and explorers who started to flock into the Chagga. This seemingly well calculated generosity made his chiefdom extremely popular to the coast and to the Europeans. Apart from all these well learned visitors to his chiefdom, it was an explorer Sir Henry H.H. Johnston in 1884 who attempted to work on the etymology of the land. He investigated the meaning of the word 'Moshi' and the answers he got from traditional elders and others was just the variant of its pronunciations, like 'mushi', or 'muschi', 'moschi' etc.etc. One thing he was assured was that the name did not relate to the Swahili word for smoke, i.e. moshi, as Chagga had a different word for that. He therefore had to conclude that the word 'probably comes from one of the kichagga terms or word'. It's amazing how at that time couldn't the people of Moshi know the origin of the word for their chiefdom? It is not clear when they told him it was 'mushi' if they meant name of people, a certain locality or another pronunciation. However, a story that circulates now among the natives of the land (which is also repeated by Professor Isaria Kimambo and A.J. Temu in their book) is that the name Moshi is a modification of the name of a certain locality near that of Chief Rindi's boma (court), and that place was very popular at that time. The place was known as Kimotchi which was a popular local market in the area. But the problem with this theory is how would a chief's neighbouring village become the name of his chiefdom and the transition from Kimotchi to Motchi (or Moshi) is not very clear. Whatever the case is, the fact is that the meaning for the word 'Moshi' as used for Rindi's chiefdom is not clear to us today.

Machame as a political establishment

Mary Kathleen Stahl correctly presents the middle southwestern settlement of the Chagga as the Kikafu basin settlement. Her history, although written from a revisionist point of view, aligns to some extent with native narrations and some earlier written sources on the area. Before Kikafu basin settlement there was no Machame as the latter was a later development based on what happened around the Kikafu basin. The ancestors who migrated to the Chagga at that time settled along the Kikafu river basin in an area today close to where the main road from Moshi to Arusha passes. Narrations identify two leaders of the populace; Mshami and Lemireny (popularly known as Nrwo). Lemireny means 'path finder'; the one believed to be endowed with insights to discern the right direction, and Mshami, whose leadership was by virtue of being the eldest son of Lemireny's elderly brother Nyari who had died while en route from their earlier settlement. It is not clear for how long they settled along the lower plain of Kikafu river near today's village of Kwa Sadala, but what is recalled is that after sometime they resolved to part with Lemireny (either also known as Mbise or was his son) choosing to go to settle on the plains of Mount Meru. However, some narrations claim that Mbise the lesser, chose the junior Meru as Mshami the elder settled with the senior, i.e. Kilimanjaro.
|-
Kafo Mushi! Kafo Shangali!

See Also 

 Kilimanjaro Region
 Chaga languages
 Kirombo Language
 Kivunjo language
 Mount Kilimanjaro
 Moshi
 Battle of Kilimanjaro
 Pare people
 Pare Mountains
 Lake Chala

References

Further reading 

Geography of Kilimanjaro Region